Boskoop Snijdelwijk railway station is a railway station in Boskoop, South Holland, Netherlands that opened on 10 December 2017. It is located on the Gouda–Alphen aan den Rijn railway, which connects Gouda and Alphen aan den Rijn, between Boskoop and Waddinxveen Noord stations.

References

Railway stations in South Holland
Railway stations opened in 2017
2017 establishments in the Netherlands
Railway stations in the Netherlands opened in the 21st century